Horace A. Ford (1822–1880) is known as one of the greatest target archers of all time.

Biography

Ford first picked up the bow in 1845, and a mere four years later won the Grand National Archery Meeting held in the United Kingdom. He proceeded to win an unmatched, eleven consecutive championships, and a twelfth "comeback" win. His high score - that of 1271 in the Double York Round in 1857 - remained archery's high mark for over 70 years.

He is the author of Archery: Its Theory and Practice, one of the all-time classics of archery.

Several members of his family were good cricketers, including Francis Ford. His father was solicitor and bill discounter George Samuel Ford.

Ford owned, in partnership with his father and brother, the Bryndu Colliery from 1842 and was a director of the Bristol and South Wales Railway Waggon Company (Limited).

Ford died in Bath, England on the 24 June 1880.

Victories 
Grand Archery Meeting Birmingham 1858, 1868
Grand Archery Meeting Hastings 1867
Grand Crystal Palace Archery Meeting 1859, 1861, 1863, 1867
Grand Leamington and Midland Archery Meeting 1855, 1856, 1857, 1858, 1860, 1861, 1862, 1863, 1867, 1868, 1869
Grand National Archery Meeting 1849, 1850, 1851, 1852, 1853, 1854, 1855, 1856, 1857, 1858, 1859, 1867
Grand Western Archery Meeting 1863, 1868

Bibliography 
Archery - Its theory and practice (1856)
Archery - Its theory and practice 2nd Edition (1859)
Archery during my years of championship (1864)
Archery - Its theory and practice American Edition (1880)

References

External links
 Modern crossbow archery at The Archer's Register.com
 Archery: its theory and practice by Horace A. Ford.
 
 
 Horace Alfred Ford Career Summary at The Archer's Register.com

1822 births
1880 deaths
British male archers